Baruch ben Yehoshua Yechezkel Feivel Fränkel-Te'omim, Boruch Frankel Thumim (1760–1828) was a rabbi, Talmudist at Vishnitsa, Austrian Galicia, and at Leipnik, Moravia, during the first half of the 19th century.

Biography
He was the grandson of Aryeh Löb ben Joshua Feiwel Te'omim and the grandson of Rabbi Jonah Teomim Frankel (the "Kikayon Deyona"). The word "tə'omim" (תְּאוֹמִים) means "twins". His daughter married Rabbi Chaim Halberstam, the Sanzer Rebbe.

Published works
He is best known for his work, Baruch Taam (ברוך טעם).

References

External links 
 Jewish Encyclopedia

Frankel-Te'omim,
1760 births
1828 deaths